The Pennsylvania State Game Lands Number 35 are Pennsylvania State Game Lands in Susquehanna County in Pennsylvania in the United States providing hunting, bird watching, and other activities.

Geography
State Game Lands Number 35 is located in Great Bend, Harmony, Jackson and New Milford Townships in Susquehanna County. Maunatome Mountain (summit elevation ) is located just outside of the Game Lands to the northwest. Other nearby protected areas include Pennsylvania State Game Lands Number 70 to the northwest, Pennsylvania State Game Lands Number 175 close by to the southwest and Salt Springs State Park to the west.

Statistics

References

035
Protected areas of Susquehanna County, Pennsylvania